Strange – A Black and White Mode by Anton Corbijn is the second music video compilation by Depeche Mode, featuring the first five Depeche Mode videos directed by Anton Corbijn, released in 1988. Corbijn shot the entire video album in Super-8.

The five videos are mostly in black and white, except for some random megaphones that were colored red. There are the three main singles for Music for the Masses, the final Black Celebration single "A Question of Time", and "Pimpf", the instrumental closer to Music for the Masses. The "Pimpf" video is currently exclusive to "Strange".

Releases

UK official releases
VVC248 (Mute Film VHS video)
VVC336 (Mute Film VHS video), a limited edition with six postcards, four of them signed by the band members
MF026 (Mute Film VHS video), re-issued in 1999

USA official releases
38147-3 (Sire/Reprise VHS video)

Japan official releases
BVVP-90 (BMG VHS video), includes a notes sheet and a postcard
BVLP-90 (BMG LaserDisc video)

All videos are present on all releases.
 "A Question of Time" [Remix]
 "Strangelove" [7" Version]
 "Never Let Me Down Again" [Split Mix], longer than the video on "The Videos 86–98" and "The Videos 86-98+"
 "Behind the Wheel" [Album version], longer than the video on "The Videos 86–98" and "The Videos 86-98+"
 "Pimpf"

All songs were written by Martin L. Gore
All videos were directed by Anton Corbijn

References

Depeche Mode video albums
1988 video albums
Music video compilation albums
1988 compilation albums